Agnes Reisch (born 11 October 1999) is a German ski jumper. She has competed at World Cup level since the 2015/16 season, with her best individual result being 13th place in Oberstdorf on 30 January 2016, which was also her World Cup debut. At the 2017 Junior World Championships in Park City, she won a team gold and silver medal; at the 2016 Winter Youth Olympics in Lillehammer, she won a team silver medal.

References

External links

 
 

1999 births
Living people
German female ski jumpers
Ski jumpers at the 2016 Winter Youth Olympics
21st-century German women